Viktor Smyrnov (born 2 August 1986 in Donetsk, Ukrainian SSR) is a paralympic swimmer from Ukraine competing mainly in category S11 events.

Viktor has competed at two Paralympic games, winning ten medals, five of them gold.  In the 2004 Summer Paralympics he won all of his five golds winning the  backstroke, butterfly and freestyle, the  individual medley and the  freestyle, he also finished second behind countryman Oleksandr Mashchenko who broke the world record in the 100m breaststroke and picked up a bronze in the  freestyle. The 2008 Summer Paralympics would not prove as profitable in terms of medals for Viktor as he picked up three bronzes, in the 100m backstroke, breaststroke and butterfly. He was disqualified in the 100m freestyle final, finished fifth in the 50m freestyle and fourth in the 400m freestyle.

References

External links
 

1986 births
Living people
Sportspeople from Donetsk
Ukrainian male freestyle swimmers
Paralympic swimmers of Ukraine
S11-classified Paralympic swimmers
Paralympic gold medalists for Ukraine
Paralympic silver medalists for Ukraine
Paralympic bronze medalists for Ukraine
Swimmers at the 2004 Summer Paralympics
Swimmers at the 2008 Summer Paralympics
Swimmers at the 2012 Summer Paralympics
Swimmers at the 2020 Summer Paralympics
Medalists at the 2004 Summer Paralympics
Medalists at the 2008 Summer Paralympics
Medalists at the 2012 Summer Paralympics
Medalists at the 2020 Summer Paralympics
Medalists at the World Para Swimming European Championships
Donetsk National University alumni
Recipients of the title of Hero of Ukraine
Paralympic medalists in swimming
Recipients of the Order of Gold Star (Ukraine)
Ukrainian male backstroke swimmers
Ukrainian male butterfly swimmers
Ukrainian male breaststroke swimmers
Ukrainian male medley swimmers